The fifteenth season of American Idol, also branded as American Idol: The Farewell Season, premiered on the Fox television network on January 6, 2016. Ryan Seacrest continued as the show's host, while Jennifer Lopez, Keith Urban, and Harry Connick Jr. returned as judges. Scott Borchetta also returned as the in-house mentor. This season was four to six weeks shorter than seasons 2 through 14. On April 7, Trent Harmon was announced as the season's winner and La'Porsha Renae was the runner-up. Harmon was the third consecutive winner to never be in the bottom two or three, and the eighth male winner in nine years.

It was the series' final season to air on Fox. Despite its publicity that the series would be ending, it was announced by ABC that the network would revive American Idol in May 2017; the revival started in 2018.

Changes
For the first time, performances by the Top 24 were judged solely by the show's judges and producers, who determined which contestants were eliminated. From each group of 12, seven advanced and five were eliminated, resulting in a Top 14 for the third week of the semi-finals.

The voting limit for this season was ten votes per contestant per voting method, half of what it was the previous season.

Regional auditions
Auditions took place in:

The American Idol "Audition Bus Tour" visited Seattle, Washington; Providence, Rhode Island; Baltimore, Maryland; San Diego, California; Pittsburgh, Pennsylvania; Tucson, Arizona; Indianapolis, Indiana; Santa Fe, New Mexico; Athens, Georgia; Tulsa, Oklahoma; and Oxford, Mississippi.  Auditions were also held in Wilmington, North Carolina. The show also partnered with two technology companies to allow people to audition using video recording kiosks and mobile apps in Culver City, California, and Nashville, Tennessee.

Kanye West made a surprise appearance as an auditioner in San Francisco, where he performed "Gold Digger". His audition was shown near the end of the first episode.

Hollywood week 
Hollywood Week aired in three parts over two weeks. They were filmed at the Dolby Theatre in Hollywood, California in mid-late November 2015. Contestants participated in three rounds: lines of ten, groups, and solos.

Semi-finalists 

The following is a list of the Top 24 contestants who were eliminated:

The following is a list of the Top 14 contestants who were eliminated:

Semi-finals 
The Top 24 semifinalists will be split into two groups of twelve. They were filmed at The Vibiana in Los Angeles, California. Pre-taped performances of the first group aired on February 10 and the second group on February 17. On the following day each week, pre-taped performances of each contestant performing a duet with a past Idol contender aired, as did the judges selection of seven contestants from each group to advance to the Top 14. The past contestants for group one were season 2 winner Ruben Studdard, season 3 winner Fantasia Barrino, season 10 winner Scotty McCreery, season 10 runner-up Lauren Alaina, season 13 winner Caleb Johnson, and last season's winner Nick Fradiani. The past contestants for group two were season 4  finalist Constantine Maroulis, season 5 finalists Chris Daughtry and Kellie Pickler, season 6 winner Jordin Sparks, season 7 winner David Cook, and season 10 finalist Haley Reinhart.

Color key:

Group 1 
The first group of 12 semifinalists performed on a taping on February 2, 2016 and aired on February 10 and 11, 2016.

Group 2 
Performances for the second group of the other 12 semifinalists were taped on February 9, 2016 and aired on February 17 and 18, 2016.

Wild Card round 
Following the judges selection of four semifinalists to advance to the Finals, the remaining ten semifinalists competed for the viewers' vote to advance six of them to complete the final group of ten. They were filmed February 23, 2016, at CBS Television City in Hollywood, California, and aired February 24, 2016.

Finalists 

 Trent Harmon (born October 8, 1990) is from Amory, Mississippi. Harmon fell into music when his mother taught him to sing "Amazing Grace" at the age of 5. His family owns a farm and a restaurant. He sang and performed in numerous musicals throughout high school and college. Before his graduation from the University of Arkansas at Monticello, he led worship services on campus. He previously tried out for an audition on The Voice. He auditioned in Little Rock, Arkansas, singing "Unaware" by Allen Stone. When Harmon suffered mononucleosis during Hollywood Week, he continued by singing Sam Smith's "Lay Me Down" as his first solo performance. In group round, he was not able to perform with other contestants due to his sickness and the producers allowed him to perform a solo to advance. He landed a spot in the Top 24 during Showcase Week after performing Elton John's "Tiny Dancer". On April 7, Harmon was named as the winner of the fifteenth season and received a recording contract with Big Machine Records. His single "Falling" was then released, and peaked at number 3 on the iTunes Top 100.
 La'Porsha Renae (born August 1, 1993) is a call representative from McComb, Mississippi. At 16, she once tried out for Idol during the eighth season.  After her college graduation at the age of 22, Renae was a former victim of domestic abuse. After a year, she separated with her husband and moved to McComb with her one month old daughter Nayalee Keya.  Accompanied with her daughter, she returned to audition at Little Rock, Arkansas and earned her golden ticket by performing in front of the judges with Radiohead's Creep. During Hollywood Week, she performed Katy Perry's "Roar" in her first solo performance. She advanced to the Top 24 after she sang "The House of the Rising Sun" at Showcase Week. She was the last female contestant. Renae was announced as the runner-up on April 7. It was revealed on the season finale that Renae had received a recording contract with Big Machine Records.
 Dalton Rapattoni (born February 6, 1996) is from Sunnyvale, Texas. At the age of 11, he started learning to play guitar. Rapattoni works as a vocal coach in School of Rock. He was a member of the band Fly Away Hero. In 2012, Rapattoni was discovered in a national talent search where he was part of Disney boy band IM5 with other four members. After he left the band in 2014, he reformed his former band Fly Away Hero with new bandmates. Rapattoni auditioned in Little Rock, Arkansas and sang "The Phantom of the Opera". In his first solo performance in Hollywood rounds, he sang "California Dreamin'" by The Mamas & the Papas. He sang Olivia Newton-John's "Hopelessly Devoted to You" in his final solo performance. He advanced to the Top 24 after he sang "It's Gonna Be Me" by NSYNC during Showcase Week.  He was eliminated on April 6 and finished in third place.
 MacKenzie Bourg (born September 11, 1992) is from Lafayette, Louisiana. He was a contestant on the third season of The Voice where he was defaulted to CeeLo Green's team after being voted off in the first live show. Bourg auditioned at Atlanta performing a medley of songs by the judges. He sang his original song "Roses" for his final solo performance to advance to the Showcase round. Bourg advanced to the top 24 after he performed "Can't Help Falling in Love". He was eliminated on March 31. Bourg released his single "Roses" in association with Big Machine Records on April 7. His single peaked at number 4 of the iTunes Top 100.
Sonika Vaid (born August 4, 1995) was originally from Weston, Massachusetts who moved to Martha's Vineyard. She is of Indian descent and her parents immigrated to the U.S. when she was a child. She began singing at the age of three. Aside from singing, she also plays the piano. She graduated from Weston High School in 2013. Prior to entering Idol, she was studying biology and a regular performer at a local park near her home for special events. Vaid sang "Look at Me" by Carrie Underwood at her audition in Denver, Colorado and received high praises from the judges, earning a golden ticket to Hollywood. She then progressed to the first round of Hollywood week and sang "Almost Is Never Enough". Vaid made it to the final Hollywood solo round, where she performed "One Last Time" by Ariana Grande. In Showcase round, she performed "I Surrender" by Celine Dion and advanced to the Top 24. She was eliminated on March 24.
Tristan McIntosh (born April 25, 2000) is from Nashville, Tennessee. McIntosh won Q108's Clarksville's Got Talent competition in April 2013 at the age of 13. Her mother Amy was an army major who works in the military overseas. She performs at special events and venues. She was also a member of the Children's Christian choir and the Let Freedom Sing Tour in the past. McIntosh auditioned at Little Rock, Arkansas, performing "Why Baby Why" by Mickey Guyton. During Hollywood Week, she sang "Something in the Water" by Carrie Underwood as her first solo performance. She advanced to the Showcase round after performing her final solo performance, "What Hurts the Most". She advanced  to the Top 24 after singing "Stronger" by Faith Hill. She was eliminated on March 17.
Lee Jean (born September 10, 1999) is from Bluffton, South Carolina. Jean's first experience in music is singing in high school campus. He was part of a duo with fellow musician Hannah Lindsey Lane. He auditioned at Atlanta and sang Ed Sheeran's "I See Fire". He sang "Stitches" by Shawn Mendes for his final solo performance.  In Showcase week, he sang "Make It Rain" to land a spot in the top 24. He was eliminated along with Avalon Young on March 10.
Avalon Young (born July 16, 1994) is from San Diego, California. She was named by her mother after the album of the same name by Roxy Music. She learned how to play guitar during her middle school years. Young began singing during her senior year and was a band member of "Over the Edge". Young originally works as a server at a restaurant. She auditioned in San Francisco, California by performing an acoustic version of "XO" by Beyoncé. During the final round of Hollywood week, Young sang Ariana Grande's "One Last Time" to advance in the Showcase Round. She sang "Yo (Excuse Me Miss)" by Chris Brown and advanced to the top 24 semifinals. She was eliminated along with Lee Jean on March 10.
Gianna Isabella (born March 30, 2000) is from Jackson, New Jersey. She is the daughter of singer Brenda K. Starr. In 2014, Gianna won the 'New York Dream Night Talent Search' competition. She auditioned in Philadelphia and sang "The House of the Rising Sun". She sang "One Night Only" during her first solo performance in Hollywood Week. She sang her mother's hit single "I Still Believe" during Showcase Week to advance to the Top 24. She was one of the first two finalists to be eliminated on March 3.
Olivia Rox (born January 16, 1999) is from Agoura Hills, California.  Olivia is the daughter of jazz saxophonist Warren Hill and music producer Tamara Van Cleef. She wrote her first song on the piano at the age of 4. She earned her golden ticket  during an audition in San Francisco, California, after she performed "When I Was Your Man" by Bruno Mars.  She advanced in the first round of Hollywood Week by performing "Genie in a Bottle" by Christina Aguilera. She sang one of her composed original songs to advance for the Showcase week. She advanced to the Top 24 after she sang Maroon 5's "Love Somebody". She was one of the first two finalists to be eliminated on March 3.

Finals 

The finals took place over six weeks, consisting of seven live shows. They were filmed at CBS Television City in Hollywood, California.  There were 10 finalists. Two finalists were eliminated in the first two weeks and one in each subsequent week, based on viewers' votes and the Judges' Save. Scott Borchetta served as the finalists' mentor.

Color key:

Top 10 – Songs from 2002–present 
The inaugural season winner Kelly Clarkson served as a guest judge for this episode.

Top 8 – Idol Grammy Hits 
Olivia Rox performed "Trouble" and Gianna Isabella performed "If I Ain't Got You" in the Top 8 performance night for a spot in the top eight. However, both acts (alongside Avalon Young) were revealed to be in the bottom three and they were eliminated prior.

Top 6 – American Idol All Time Song Book
For the first time this season, the contestants paired up to sing duets, which were done before revealing the results from last week's vote. Lee Jean performed "Let It Be" and Avalon Young performed "P.Y.T. (Pretty Young Thing)" in the Top 6 performance night for a spot in the top six; however, both acts were announced as bottom three (along with Sonika Vaid) and were eliminated prior.

Top 5 – America's Twitter Song Choice
The finalists performed songs requested by the voting public through Twitter. For the first time in the competition, each finalist performed two songs. Tristan McIntosh performed "Independence Day" during the Top 6 round, but was eliminated prior to the Top 5 round start.

Top 4 – Classic rock / Sia
Contestants performed two songs, a classical rock song and a song composed by Sia. Sia and Stevie Van Zandt served as guest mentors this week.

Top 3 – Hometown Dedication / Scott Borchetta's Choice / Judges' Choice
Each finalist performed a song dedicated to their hometown, a song Scott Borchetta chose, and a song the judges chose. During the first song, MacKenzie Bourg performed "Hallelujah" in the Hometown Dedication round, but was eliminated prior to the start of the next round.

Top 2 – Original's Single / Simon Fuller's Choice / Favorite Performance
Dalton Rapattoni performed "Strike A Match" in the Original's Single round, but did not advance to the finals. 

During the finals, other former contestants made appearances in both live and pre-recorded guest performances, including Clay Aiken, Lauren Alaina, Kris Allen, David Archuleta, Fantasia Barrino, Clark Beckham, Bo Bice, Kelly Clarkson, David Cook, Bucky Covington, Chris Daughtry, Diana DeGarmo, Lee DeWyze, Colton Dixon, Melinda Doolittle,  James Durbin, Nick Fradiani, Candice Glover, Danny Gokey, Mikalah Gordon, Tamyra Gray, Justin Guarini, Kree Harrison, Taylor Hicks, Amber Holcomb, Jennifer Hudson, George Huff, Allison Iraheta, Casey James, Caleb Johnson, Skylar Laine, Joshua Ledet, Blake Lewis, Kimberley Locke, LaToya London, Sanjaya Malakar, Constantine Maroulis, Scotty McCreery, Katharine McPhee, Phillip Phillips, Kellie Pickler, Brandon Rogers, Jessica Sanchez, Carly Smithson, Jordin Sparks, Ruben Studdard, Pia Toscano, Jasmine Trias, Carrie Underwood, Elliott Yamin, and Ace Young.

Elimination chart 
Color key:

Reception

U.S. Nielsen ratings 

Live + same day ratings

Season 15 premiered to 10.96 million viewers, the second lowest since the series premiere.  It received an all-time-low 3.0/9 18–49 rating, down 9% from last season. The season finale however had 13.30 million viewers, 5 million more than the season 14 finale.

Live + 7 day (DVR) ratings

International broadcasts
The season premiered in Australia on Fox8 and in New Zealand on Prime on January 7, 2016 and in the United Kingdom on January 11, 2016 on 4Music. The show broadcasts live throughout Africa and Middle Eastern territories on DSTV's Vuzu Channel 114, but due to it being broadcast at 2 am, there are repeats during the week. The show started in Iran in August 2017 on PMC.

Music releases
Music releases

Concert tour
This was the first season without a concert tour.

References

External links

American Idol seasons
2016 American television seasons